Corvallis to the Sea Trail is a  long hiking, bicycling, and equestrian trail in Western Oregon (United States) which links the Willamette Valley to the Pacific Ocean.  It connects between Corvallis and Ona Beach.  As of May 2019, the eastern half (about 30 miles) is open and crosses a patchwork of public and private land.  The remainder of the trail traverses Siuslaw National Forest with  requiring trail to be built.  The trail was set to open on June 6, 2020, but is delayed by the COVID-19 pandemic.

The project to establish the trail had more than 40,000 volunteer hours and $20,000 in donations.

The effort began in 1974 but failed due to private property permission difficulties.  In 2004, the C2C partnership was created and it proved able to work successfully with Siuslaw National Forest officials.

References

External links 
 Corvallis to the Sea partnership

Hiking trails in Oregon
Bike paths in Oregon
2017 establishments in Oregon
Transportation in Benton County, Oregon
Transportation in Lincoln County, Oregon
Long-distance trails in the United States